Dublin Business School (DBS), incorporating Portobello College, is a private college in Ireland. With over 9,000 students, DBS provides full-time and part-time undergraduate and postgraduate programmes in business, law, accounting, event management, IT, arts, media studies and psychology. The college's undergraduate and part-time degrees are recognised by Quality and Qualifications Ireland (QQI). The college is owned by Kaplan, Inc., part of the Graham Holdings Company.

History
DBS was founded in 1975 as 'Accountancy and Business College'. In 1999, Dublin Business School acquired LSB College Dublin.

In 2003, DBS was taken over by Kaplan, Inc., a wholly owned subsidiary of The Washington Post Company, and by 2004, it had around 5,500 students.

In 2006, DBS bought European Business School Dublin (EBS), a collective of eight independent business schools located throughout Europe.

Portobello College, a law school led by Raymond Kearns, was taken over by DBS in 2007. It allowed DBS to incorporate a law school offering both undergraduate and postgraduate programmes to its students.

In 2008, the Lidl chain of supermarkets made an agreement with DBS to create a degree oriented to the retail industry.

Notable alumni
Irish personality and Q102 radio presenter Ray Shah attended the school in the graduate year of 2003, just before he auditioned for Big Brother 4.

Campus
The Dublin Business School has six locations around Dublin. Its main campus is located in Aungier Street, and other locations include Balfe Street, Dame Street and South Great George's Street.

References 

Business schools in the Republic of Ireland
Education in Dublin (city)
Educational institutions established in 1975
Universities and colleges in the Republic of Ireland